Marcelo Andrés Martuciello (born December 22, 1976 in Montevideo, Uruguay) is a Uruguayan footballer.

Teams
  Deportivo Maldonado 1999–2000
  Querétaro 2000–2001
  Deportivo Maldonado 2002–2003
  Fénix 2003–2004
  Tacuarembó 2005
  Comunicaciones 2006
  Miramar Misiones 2006–2007
  Sporting Cristal 2007
  Miramar Misiones 2008–2011
  Bella Vista 2011–2013

References
 Profile at BDFA 
 

1976 births
Living people
Uruguayan footballers
Uruguayan expatriate footballers
Uruguayan Primera División players
Centro Atlético Fénix players
Deportivo Maldonado players
C.A. Bella Vista players
Miramar Misiones players
Tacuarembó F.C. players
Querétaro F.C. footballers
Comunicaciones F.C. players
Sporting Cristal footballers
Expatriate footballers in Guatemala
Expatriate footballers in Mexico
Expatriate footballers in Peru

Association football defenders